The 1971–72 Honduran Segunda División was the sixth season of the Honduran Segunda División.  Under the management of Alfonso Uclés, Universidad won the tournament after defeating C.D. Victoria in the final series and obtained promotion to the 1972–73 Honduran Liga Nacional.

Final

 Universidad 2–2 Victoria on aggregate. Universidad won 4–3 on penalties

References

Segunda
1971